The 2012 USASA National Women's Cup was the 17th edition of the annual national soccer championship.  The Chicago Red Stars won in their inaugural Cup campaign, beating the New York Athletic Club (NYAC) with just half of their official squad, the other half playing in the final regular-season WPSL Elite game.

Regional Phase

Region I

Region II

Region III

Region IV

National Finals

Semi-finals

Final

References

2012
Open
United